The Peaucellier–Lipkin linkage (or Peaucellier–Lipkin cell, or Peaucellier–Lipkin inversor), invented in 1864, was the first true planar straight line mechanism – the first planar linkage capable of transforming rotary motion into perfect straight-line motion, and vice versa. It is named after Charles-Nicolas Peaucellier (1832–1913), a French army officer, and Yom Tov Lipman Lipkin (1846–1876), a Lithuanian Jew and son of the famed Rabbi Israel Salanter.

Until this invention, no planar method existed of converting exact straight-line motion to circular motion, without reference guideways. In 1864, all power came from steam engines, which had a piston moving in a straight-line up and down a cylinder. This piston needed to keep a good seal with the cylinder in order to retain the driving medium, and not lose energy efficiency due to leaks. The piston does this by remaining perpendicular to the axis of the cylinder, retaining its straight-line motion. Converting the straight-line motion of the piston into circular motion was of critical importance. Most, if not all, applications of these steam engines, were rotary.

The mathematics of the Peaucellier–Lipkin linkage is directly related to the inversion of a circle.

Earlier Sarrus linkage
There is an earlier straight-line mechanism, whose history is not well known, called the Sarrus linkage. This linkage predates the Peaucellier–Lipkin linkage by 11 years and consists of a series of hinged rectangular plates, two of which remain parallel but can be moved normally to each other. Sarrus' linkage is of a three-dimensional class sometimes known as a space crank, unlike the Peaucellier–Lipkin linkage which is a planar mechanism.

Geometry

Also, point  is fixed. On the other hand, if point  were constrained to move along a line (not passing through ), then point  would necessarily have to move along a circle (passing through ).

Mathematical proof of concept

Collinearity
This may be easily seen by observing that the linkage is mirror-symmetric about line , so point  must fall on that line.

Finally, because they form a complete circle, we have

Inverse points
Therefore, length  = length .

Triangle  is congruent to triangle , because side  is congruent to side , side  is congruent to itself, and side  is congruent to side  . Therefore, angle  = angle .

Let:

Then:

 (due to the Pythagorean theorem)
(same expression expanded)
 (Pythagorean theorem)

Inversive geometry
Thus, by the properties of inversive geometry, since the figure traced by point  is the inverse of the figure traced by point , if  traces a circle passing through the center of inversion , then  is constrained to trace a straight line.  But if  traces a straight line not passing through , then  must trace an arc of a circle passing through . Q.E.D.

A typical driver

Peaucellier–Lipkin linkages (PLLs) may have several inversions. A typical example is shown in the opposite figure, in which a rocker-slider four-bar serves as the input driver. To be precise, the slider acts as the input, which in turn drives the right grounded link of the PLL, thus driving the entire PLL.

Historical notes
Sylvester (Collected Works, Vol. 3, Paper 2) writes that when he showed a model to Kelvin, he “nursed it as if it had been his own child, and when a motion was made to relieve him of it, replied ‘No! I have not had nearly enough of it—it is the most beautiful thing I have ever seen in my life.’”

Cultural references
A monumental-scale sculpture implementing the linkage in illuminated struts is on permanent exhibition in Eindhoven, Netherlands. The artwork measures , weighs , and can be operated from a control panel accessible to the general public.

See also

Linkage (mechanical)
Straight line mechanism

References

Bibliography
 
  — proof and discussion of Peaucellier–Lipkin linkage, mathematical and real-world mechanical models
  (and references cited therein)
 Hartenberg, R.S. & J. Denavit (1964) Kinematic synthesis of linkages, pp 181–5, New York: McGraw–Hill, weblink from Cornell University.

External links

 How to Draw a Straight Line, online video clips of linkages with interactive applets.
 How to Draw a Straight Line, historical discussion of linkage design
 Interactive Java Applet with proof.
 Java animated Peaucellier–Lipkin linkage
 Jewish Encyclopedia article on Lippman Lipkin and his father Israel Salanter
Peaucellier   Apparatus features an interactive applet
A simulation using the Molecular Workbench software
A related linkage called Hart's Inversor.
Modified Peaucellier robotic arm linkage (Vex Team 1508 video)

Linkages (mechanical)
Articles containing proofs
Linear motion
Straight line mechanisms